is a Japanese electronics company, whose main products are electrolytic capacitors, film capacitors and power supply units with a wide range of applications including consumer, industrial, power, lighting and automotive.

Founded in 1952 as Nihon Denkai Seisakusho (有限会社日本電解製作所), it changed its name to Shin-Ei Electronics Inc. (信英電子株式会社) in 1960.
The company was formerly known as Seibu Shin-Ei Inc. and changed its name to Rubycon Corporation in December 1990.

 and has 11 production sites  10 in Japan and one in Indonesia. Rubycon appointed Supreme Components International, a Singapore-based electronics distributor, as their franchised distributor.

References

External links 

Electronics companies of Japan
Capacitor manufacturers
Companies based in Nagano Prefecture
Electronics companies established in 1952
Japanese companies established in 1952
Japanese brands